Raimmandhoo (Dhivehi: ރަތްމަންދޫ) or Raiymandhoo is one of the inhabited islands of Meemu Atoll.

Geography

Ecology
Parrotfishes, snappers, surgeonfishes and wrasses are common in the waters around the island.

Demography

Utilities
The power supply on Raiymandhoo is provided by a combination of solar, wind and diesel power.

Healthcare
Raiymandhoo has a pharmacy.

See also

List of lighthouses in the Maldives

References

Islands of the Maldives
Lighthouses in the Maldives